Mater Dei College also referred to by its acronym MDC is a private, Roman Catholic, co-educational  basic and higher  education institution located located in Tubigon, Bohol, Philippines. It was established in 1983.

History
It was during the term of Hon. Eufrasio Mascarinas as mayor of the town that the school was established. Bohol's prominent residents together with the local government unit had joined hands to build a community college for local residents who are economically challenged to send their children to big cities to obtain college education. During that time, Tagbilaran City was the only nearest place that offers college education and only few are capable of sending their children to Cebu and Manila for higher education.

It is through the efforts of then Sangguniang Bayan secretary, Cesar Mascarinas, parish priest Msgr. Camilo V. Auza and an educator Lourdes H. Torrefranca, Ph.D., that drafted the idea of funding a college into a reality. Finally, Resolution no. 78 (series of 1983) of the town council was passed for this act. The first set of the Members of the Board of Trustees and Incorporators of the school were:

Rev. Fr. Josemaria S. Luengo, Ph.D. 
Lourdes H. Torrefranca, Ph.D.
Most Rev. Felix S. Zafra, D.D.
Benjamin L. Mejorada, Ph.D.
Msgr. Camilo V. Auza, H.P. 
Rose P. Alfafara, O.D.
Mariano M. Lerin, Ph.D.; CPA
Cesar C. Mascarinas, M.A.

Colleges
Mater Dei College consists of six colleges namely:
College of Accountancy, Business and Management- Business Department (CABM-B)
College of Accountancy, Business and Management- Hospitality Department (CABM-H)
College of Arts and Sciences and Technology (CAST)
College of Criminal Justice (CCJ)
College of Nursing (CON)
College of Education (COE)

Course offering

Graduate programs

Master of Arts major in English Language Teaching (MA-ELT)
Master of Arts major in Mathematics Teaching (MAMT)
Master of Arts major in Educational Management (MAEM)
Master of Arts major in Business Management (MABM)
Master of Arts major in Public Services Management (MAPSM)
Master of Arts major in Values Education (MAVED)

Baccalaureate programs

Bachelor of Science in Nursing (BSN)
Bachelor of Science in Information Technology (BSIT)
Bachelor of Science in Computer Science (BSCS)
Bachelor of Science in Information Systems (BSIS)
Bachelor of Science in Tourism Management (BSTM)
Bachelor of Science in Hotel & Restaurant Management (BSHRM)
Bachelor of Science in Accountancy (BSA)
Bachelor of Science in Business Administration (BSBA) in:
Financial Management
Marketing Management
Operations Management
Bachelor of Arts in Economics (AB Econ)
Bachelor of Arts in English (AB Engl)
Bachelor of Science in Criminology (BSCRIM)
Bachelor of Science in Mathematics (BS Math)
Bachelor of Elementary Education (BEED) in:
Special Education
Pre-Elementary Education
Bachelor of Secondary Education (BSED) in:
English
Filipino
Social Studies
Mathematics
Values Education
Science

Pre-baccalaureate programs

Associate in Computer Technology (ACT)
Associate in Hotel & Restaurant Management (AHRM)

Basic education

Preschool
Elementary
Junior High School
Senior High School

References

External links
 Official Website of Mater Dei College

Universities and colleges in Bohol